{|

{{Infobox ship characteristics
|Hide header=
|Header caption=after rebuilding
|Ship class=
|Ship type=
|Ship tonnage=
|Ship displacement=* (standard)
 (full load)
|Ship length=
|Ship beam=
|Ship height=
|Ship draught=
|Ship draft=
|Ship depth=
|Ship hold depth=
|Ship decks=
|Ship deck clearance=
|Ship ramps=
|Ship ice class=
|Ship power=
|Ship propulsion=
|Ship sail plan=
|Ship speed=
|Ship range= at 
|Ship endurance=
|Ship test depth=
|Ship boats=
|Ship capacity=
|Ship troops=
|Ship complement=
|Ship crew=
|Ship time to activate=
|Ship sensors=
|Ship EW=
|Ship armament=*Chidori, November 19343 × 12 cm/45 3rd Year Type naval guns (3 × 1)
1 ×  machine gun
2 ×  torpedo tubes (1 × 2)
9 × depth chargesHatsukari, December 19442 × 12 cm/45 3rd Year Type naval guns (2 × 1)
10 Type 96 25mm AA guns (10 × 1)
2 ×  torpedo tubes (1 × 2)
48 × depth charges
|Ship armour=
|Ship armor=
|Ship aircraft=
|Ship aircraft facilities=
|Ship notes=
}}
|}

The {{nihongo|Chidori-class torpedo boat'''|千鳥型水雷艇|Chidori-gata suiraitei}} was an Imperial Japanese Navy class of torpedo boats that were built before and served during the Second World War. The design initially proved to have too much armament for its small displacement, and the capsizing of  shortly after completion in heavy weather resulted in a scandal which called into question the basic design of many Japanese warships of the time. After extensive modification, the class became satisfactory sea-boats and saw service in the Battle of the Philippines and the Dutch East Indies campaign as escorts and continued in that role for the rest of the war. Three were sunk during the war and the fourth was seized by the British at Hong Kong after the end of the war, where it was scrapped later.

Background

Per the terms of the 1930 London Naval Treaty, the Imperial Japanese Navy was constricted on the total tonnage of destroyers it was allowed to construct. In response, Japanese naval planners designed a 600-ton class vessel (which was small enough not to be limited by the treaty), but planned to arm it with half the armament of a  destroyer. The new vessels were designated "torpedo boats" to further ensure that they would not be considered as "destroyers". Four vessels were ordered as part of the 1931 Maru 1 Programme, out of a planned twenty.

Description
As initially completed the Chidori-class torpedo vessels displaced  at standard load, but displaced  at full load. Two Kampon geared turbines drove two shafts.

The Chidori-class were exceedingly heavily armed for their size. The main battery consisted of three  Type 3 guns mounted in a single-gun power-driven gun turret placed on the forecastle, ahead of the bridge, and a power-driven twin-gun turret aft. Sources are contradictory on her anti-aircraft armament, Whitley says that they had a single license-built Vickers 40 mm (2 pounder pom pom) and others credit them with a single  machine gun. Two sets of twin  torpedo launchers were mounted abaft the single funnel. In total these weapons represented 22.7% of the displacement. One Type 94 depth charge launcher was also carried.

After the lead vessel Chidori was completed, it was discovered during trials that her center of gravity was too high and that she was  overweight. To compensate,  bulges fitted to the rest of the class. However, this proved to be insufficient. The Tomozuru Incident of March 12, 1934, resulted in an extensive redesign in which the Type 3 guns were replaced by smaller single 12 cm/45 3rd Year Type naval guns and one of the twin torpedo launchers was removed. An additional 100 tons of ballast also helped lower the center-of-gravity, but also meant the top speed was reduced to 28 knots.

In 1944, the rear gun was removed and replaced with a twin-mount Type 96 25mm AA gun. Another twin-mount was located in front of the bridge and six single-mounts were added in various locations. The number of depth charges carried was also increased over the course of the war to 48.

The Tomozuru Incident
On 12 March 1934, shortly after completion,  sailed in company with her sister  and the light cruiser  for night torpedo training. The weather worsened during the exercise and it was called off at 0325; the ships returning to port. Tomozuru never arrived and a search was launched. She was spotted at 1405 that same day, capsized and inverted, but still afloat. Thirteen of her 113-man crew were rescued. She was towed to Sasebo and docked, where she was rebuilt and returned to service.

Consequences
This disaster forced the Imperial Japanese Navy to review the stability of every ship recently completed, under construction or still being designed. The Chidori-class was forced to reduce its armament load and the bridge structure was cut down by one level. The remaining 16 vessels planned for the class were cancelled, and replaced by the  torpedo boats, which were redesigned to reduce the top-heaviness that caused Tomozuru to capsize.

Service

In 1937, the four sisters were organized into Torpedo Flotilla 21 and made a sortie for the Battle of Shanghai. All four saw action in the Battle of the Philippines and the Dutch East Indies campaign. Chidori and Manazuru returned to home waters after Torpedo Flotilla 21 was disbanded in the spring of 1942 and were on escort duties for the rest of the war. Hatsukari and Tomozuru remained in that area for most of the rest of the war on escort operations. Tomozuru returned to Japan late in the war, but Hatsukari entered Hong Kong on 21 May 1945 and was engaged in anti-aircraft battles until the end of war. Following Japan's surrender, the Hatsukari was seized by the Royal Navy, and later scrapped.

Ships in class

Notes

Books
 
 
 
 , History of Pacific War Vol.62 Ships of The Imperial Japanese Forces, Gakken (Japan), January 2008, Collection of writings by Sizuo Fukui Vol.5, Stories of Japanese Destroyers, Kōjinsha (Japan) 1993, Collection of writings by Sizuo Fukui Vol.10, Stories of Japanese Support Vessels, Kōjinsha (Japan), December 1993, Model Art Extra No.340, Drawings of Imperial Japanese Naval Vessels Part-1, Model Art Co. Ltd. (Japan), October 1989Model Art Ship Modelling Special No.25, Genealogy of Japanese Destroyers Part-2, Model Art Co. Ltd. (Japan), August 2007The Maru Special, Japanese Naval Vessels No.39 Japanese torpedo boats, Ushio Shobō (Japan), May 1980The Maru Special, War ship mechanism 4, Japanese destroyers'', Ushio Shobō (Japan), November 1982

External links

 
Torpedo boat classes